Polygonal masonry is a technique of stone wall construction.  True polygonal masonry is a technique wherein the visible surfaces of the stones are dressed with straight sides or joints, giving the block the appearance of a polygon.

This technique is found throughout the world and sometimes corresponds to the less technical category of Cyclopean masonry.

Places

Crimea
Chufut-Kale
Mangup
Vorontsov Palace

Easter Island

Ahu Vinapu

Ecuador
Ingapirca

Finland

Bomarsund Fortress
Suomenlinna

Georgia
Anacopia Fortress
Ateni Sioni Church
Bagrati Cathedral
Gudarekhi
Gelati Monastery

Greece

Delphi
Keramikos
Nekromanteion

Hungary
Komárom
Fort Monostor

India
Vellore Fort
Great Wall of India
Murud Janjira

Indonesia
Nias
Toraja

Iran
Si-o-se-pol

Italy

In Italy, polygonal masonry is particularly indicative of the region of Latium, but it occurs also in Etruria, Lucania, Samnium, and Umbria; scholars including Giuseppe Lugli have carried out studies of the technique.  Some notable sites that have fortification walls built in this technique include Norba, Signia, Alatri, Boiano, Circeo, Cosa, Alba Fucens, Palestrina, and Terracina. The Porta Rosa of the ancient city of Velia employs a variant of the technique known as Lesbian masonry.

Santa Severa
Rialto Bridge

Japan

Akō Castle
Fushimi Castle
Goryōkaku
Nakagusuku Castle
Nijō Castle
Odawara Castle
Oka Castle
Osaka Castle
Shibata Castle
Shuri Castle
Uwajima Castle

Latvia

Daugavpils

Malta
Corradino Lines
Ħaġar Qim
Megalithic Temples of Malta

Mexico
Teotihuacan

Montenegro

Fort Gorazda
Fort Trašte
Lovćen

Morocco
Lixus

Peru

Chinchero
Chullpa Towers
Coricancha
Inti Watana, Ayacucho

Ollantaytambo
Raqch'i
Saksaywaman
Tambomachay
Tarawasi
Usnu
Vilcabamba
Vilcashuamán
Wanuku Pampa
Twelve-angled_stone

Philippines
Fort Pilar
Fort San Pedro

Portugal
Quinta da Regaleira

Romania

Curtea de Argeș Cathedral
Iulia Hasdeu Castle
Orăștioara de Sus
Sarmisegetusa

Russia

Fort Alexander
Königsberg Castle

Spain
Castell d'Olèrdola
Les Ferreres Aqueduct

Sudan
Meroë

Sweden
Älvsborg fortress
Vaberget Fortress

Syria 

Arwad
Hosn Suleiman Baitokaike
Bara
Barad
Barjaka
Basufan
 Bauda

Benastur Monastery
Church of Saint Simeon Stylites
Churches of Sheikh Suleiman village
Cyrrhus
Dana
Deir Qeita
Jarada
Kharab Shams Basilica
Mount Simeon
Mushabbak Basilica
Refade
Serjilla

Qalb Loze
Qatura

Thailand
Phi Mai
Phanom Rung

Turkey

Enderun School
Efes
Hagia Sophia
Hattusa
Lyrbe
Selimiye Barracks

United Arab Emirates
Hili Archaeological Park

United Kingdom
Gloucester Cathedral
Maes Howe
Stanton Moor

United States

The Alamo
Harsimus Stem Embankment
Hearst Castle
Yale

References

 P. Gros. 1996. L'architecture romaine: du début du IIIe siècle av. J.-C. à la fin du Haut-Empire. 2 v. Paris: Picard.

 
Masonry